Air KBZ is a privately owned domestic Myanmar airline based in Yangon. Air Kanbawza, otherwise known as AIR KBZ, was established in June 2010. The airline began operations with a Yangon-Bagan-Nyaung Oo-Mandalay-Heho-Yangon flight on 2 April 2019. In 2015 Air KBZ began codesharing international flights with its partner Myanmar Airways International, but on 2 December 2016 Air KBZ itself expanded internationally, launching its first scheduled service outside Myanmar with flights connecting Yangon and Chiang Mai in neighboring Thailand.

Destinations
Air KBZ serves the following destinations as of February 2020:

Codeshare agreements
Air KBZ has codeshare agreement with the following airline:
 Myanmar Airways International

Fleet

Current fleet
The Air KBZ fleet consists of the following aircraft (as of August 2019):

Former fleet
The airline previously operated the following aircraft (as of August 2018):
 6 ATR 72-500
 5 ATR 72-600

Sponsorships
In 2014, Air KBZ started sponsoring Myanmar's national sport, Lethwei. The event is called the Air KBZ Aung Lan Golden Belt Championship being held at Thein Phyu Stadium in Yangon.

References
http://www.airmyanmar.com/airKBZ.htm
http://www.flightglobal.com/airspace/groups/fleet_and_orders_gossip_shop/blog/archive/2011/06/06/airline-start-ups-air-kbz-launches-domestic-services.aspx
https://web.archive.org/web/20120616203810/http://www.mmtimes.com/2011/news/568/news56805.html
https://web.archive.org/web/20170406145458/http://www.jetradar-asia.com/

Airlines of Myanmar
Airlines established in 2010
2010 establishments in Myanmar
Companies based in Yangon